The 2005 New England 300 was the 19th stock car racing race of the 2005 NASCAR Nextel Cup Series season and the 13th iteration of the event. The race was held on Sunday, July 17, 2005, before a crowd of 100,000 in Loudon, New Hampshire at New Hampshire International Speedway, a  permanent, oval-shaped, low-banked racetrack. The race took the scheduled 300 laps to complete. At race's end, Tony Stewart of Joe Gibbs Racing would dominate the race to take his 22nd career NASCAR Nextel Cup Series win and his third of the season. To fill out the podium, Kurt Busch of Roush Racing and Bobby Labonte of Joe Gibbs Racing would finish second and third, respectively.

Background 

New Hampshire International Speedway is a 1.058-mile (1.703 km) oval speedway located in Loudon, New Hampshire which has hosted NASCAR racing annually since the early 1990s, as well as an IndyCar weekend and the oldest motorcycle race in North America, the Loudon Classic. Nicknamed "The Magic Mile", the speedway is often converted into a 1.6-mile (2.6 km) road course, which includes much of the oval. The track was originally the site of Bryar Motorsports Park before being purchased and redeveloped by Bob Bahre. The track is currently one of eight major NASCAR tracks owned and operated by Speedway Motorsports.

Entry list

Practice

First practice 
The first one-hour practice session would take place on Friday, July 15, at 12:10 PM EST.

Second and final practice 
The second and final one-hour practice session would take place on Friday, July 15, at 3:50 PM EST.

Qualifying 
Qualifying would take place on Saturday, July 16, at 12:10 PM EST. Each driver would have two laps to set a fastest time; the fastest of the two would count as their official qualifying lap.

Carl Long of McGlynn Racing would crash during his second lap. While he had crashed, he had set a lap time fast enough in the first lap to get him into the race, and therefore was able to still compete, albeit at the rear due to switching to a backup car.

Four drivers would fail to qualify: Joey McCarthy, Derrike Cope, Wayne Peterson, and Hermie Sadler.

Full qualifying results

Race results

References 

2005 NASCAR Nextel Cup Series
NASCAR races at New Hampshire Motor Speedway
July 2005 sports events in the United States
2005 in sports in New Hampshire